Lohne may refer to:

People
Jon Espen Lohne (born 1964), a Norwegian businessperson in the media sector

Places

Germany
Lohne, Germany, a town in the Vechta district in the western part of Lower Saxony
Lohne, a large part of the town of Wietmarschen in Grafschaft Bentheim county in the western part of Lower Saxony 
Gartenstadt Lohne, a part of the municipality of Isernhagen in the Hanover district in the southern part of Lower Saxony
Löhne, a town in the Herford district in the northeastern part of the state of North Rhine-Westphalia
Lohne (river), a river in the state of Lower Saxony

Norway
Lohne, a small village in the municipality of Søgne in Vest-Agder county